Camp Branch may refer to:

Camp Branch (Big Creek), a stream in Missouri
Camp Branch (Flat Creek), a stream in Missouri
Camp Branch (West Fork Clear Creek), a stream in Missouri
Camp Branch (Rocky River tributary), a stream in Anson County, North Carolina
Camp Branch (Swannanoa River tributary), a stream in Buncombe County, North Carolina
Camp Branch (Fisher River tributary), a stream in Surry County, North Carolina
Camp Branch Wetlands Natural Area Preserve in Floyd County, Virginia
A protected property near Mattair Springs, Florida
Camp Branch Correctional Facility, a state prison in Michigan that closed in 2009 (List of Michigan state prisons)